Bernard Bigot (24 January 1950 – 14 May 2022) was an academic, civil servant, and he served as the Director-General of the ITER organization between 2015 and 2022.

Bigot held PhDs in physics and chemistry. He was the president of the École normale supérieure de Lyon, and director of the French Commission for Atomic Energy.

Bigot died on May 14, 2022, at the age of 72.

References

External links

1950 births
2022 deaths
French nuclear physicists
People from Blois
École Normale Supérieure alumni
Pierre and Marie Curie University alumni
Commandeurs of the Légion d'honneur
Officers of the Ordre national du Mérite